Thazhava North which is better known as Kuthirapanthi  is a small village in Kollam district of Kerala state.

References

Villages in Kollam district